Reginald Edward Oliphant Jewesbury (6 August 1917 – 31 March 2001) was an English actor, notable for his film, stage and television work and as a member of the Renaissance Theatre Company. In 1982, he appeared with the Royal Shakespeare Company, appearing in The Tempest, Much Ado About Nothing and in Cyrano de Bergerac, the latter two of which he brought to Broadway in 1984, together with Derek Jacobi and Sinéad Cusack. In his later years he appeared in such television comedies as Yes Minister and Blackadder II.

In 1995 he appeared in Richard III as King Henry VI of England.

Partial filmography
John Wesley (1954) - James Hutton
Out of the Clouds (1955) - Captain Brent's Flight Engineer (uncredited)
The Winter's Tale (1967) - Shepherd / Gaoler 
Sacco e Vanzetti (1971) - Alvan T. Fuller
Little Dorrit (1987) - Magnate from the Lords
We Think the World of You (1988) - Judge 
Henry V (1989) - Sir Thomas Erpingham
Peter's Friends (1992) - Mr. Gooch, Peter's Solicitor
Much Ado About Nothing (1993) - Sexton
Mary Shelley's Frankenstein (1994) - City Official
Richard III (1995) - King Henry
The Grotesque (1995) - Sir Edward Tome
In the Bleak Midwinter (1995) - Nina's Father
Preaching to the Perverted (1997) - Judge Yell
Mrs Dalloway (1997) - Professor Brierly
Beautiful People (1999) - Joseph Thornton
The 10th Kingdom (2000) - Old Retainer
Undertaker's Paradise (2000)
Dungeons & Dragons (2000) - Vildan Vildir

References

External links

1917 births
2001 deaths
English male stage actors
English male film actors
English male television actors
Male actors from London